Paradox Lake is a 2002 Polish-American drama film directed by Przemyslaw Reut and starring Matt Wolf and Jessica Fuchs.

Cast
Phe Caplan as Rachel
Jessica Fuchs as Jessica
John Gelin as Buddha
Ernie Jurez as Ernie
Daniel Luciano as Dr. Olson
Jason Miller
Beata Tyszkiewicz as Family Doctor
Matt Wolf as Matt

Accolade
At the 18th Independent Spirit Awards, Reut won the Someone to Watch Award.

References

External links
 
 

2000s English-language films
2000s Polish-language films
American drama films
Polish drama films
Films about autism
2002 multilingual films
American multilingual films
Polish multilingual films
2000s American films